Paerata is a small settlement immediately to the north of Pukekohe, in the North Island of New Zealand. Wesley College is located close to the northern edge of Paerata.

The name Paerata is a Māori term meaning a hill ridge (pae) bedecked with rata trees. Paerata was served by the Paerata railway station for more than a century, until the station was closed. However in early 2021, KiwiRail confirmed a new railway station to be situated in Paerata Rise.

Infrastructure New Zealand suggested in October 2017 that the land around Paerata could be used for a new city with initially 30,000 homes, and a population of 500,000 people by 2050. 

Paerata Rise, a 300-hectare development north of the settlement was opened in 2018 and is still being developed in stages. It is expected to be completed by 2040.

Demographics
Paerata is part of the larger Ramarama statistical area.

Ramarama had a population of 447 at the 2018 New Zealand census, an increase of 12 people (2.8%) since the 2013 census, and an increase of 3 people (0.7%) since the 2006 census. There were 144 households, comprising 231 males and 222 females, giving a sex ratio of 1.04 males per female, with 93 people (20.8%) aged under 15 years, 81 (18.1%) aged 15 to 29, 228 (51.0%) aged 30 to 64, and 48 (10.7%) aged 65 or older.

Ethnicities were 73.2% European/Pākehā, 14.8% Māori, 17.4% Pacific peoples, 6.7% Asian, and 2.0% other ethnicities. People may identify with more than one ethnicity.

Although some people chose not to answer the census's question about religious affiliation, 50.3% had no religion, 40.3% were Christian, 0.7% had Māori religious beliefs, 0.7% were Hindu, 2.0% were Muslim and 1.3% had other religions.

Of those at least 15 years old, 84 (23.7%) people had a bachelor's or higher degree, and 63 (17.8%) people had no formal qualifications. 93 people (26.3%) earned over $70,000 compared to 17.2% nationally. The employment status of those at least 15 was that 207 (58.5%) people were employed full-time, 57 (16.1%) were part-time, and 6 (1.7%) were unemployed.

Dairy factories 
New Zealand Dairy Co opened a factory on 6 March 1924. A fire at its Pukekohe factory hastened construction. It was built of corrugated iron and used machinery previously intended for an upgrade to the Mount Eden factory. From 1950 to 1956 milk powder was produced. Casein production began in 1956. Butter production ended in 1970. In 1996 it employed 170 people, but closed in 1998. The factory then became a business park.

NIG Nutritional's milk powder plant in Paerata opened in 2012 and was extended in 2019. It processes goat milk.

Education

The college was founded in 1844, making it the oldest registered secondary school in New Zealand, and moved to its current site in 1924. It is associated with the Methodist Church of New Zealand. The junior classes (years 9–10) are for boys only, and the senior classes are coeducational.

The school opened in 1921. In 2021, the school moved its site to the Paerata Rise development

Rolls are as of

References

Reed New Zealand atlas (2004) Auckland: Reed Publishing. Map 14. 

Populated places in the Auckland Region